Marvin Terrell, Jr. (June 10, 1938 – December 1, 2018) was an American college and professional football guard who played four seasons in the American Football League from 1960–1963 for the Dallas Texans/Kansas City Chiefs.

Biography 
He was an AFL All-Star in 1962, when the Texans won the longest game up to that time, the double-overtime victory over the Houston Oilers in the AFL Championship Game.  He was inducted into the Mississippi Hall of Fame in 2001.

See also
Other American Football League players

References

1938 births
2018 deaths
People from West Memphis, Arkansas
People from Memphis, Tennessee
Players of American football from Arkansas
American football offensive guards
Ole Miss Rebels football players
Dallas Texans (AFL) players
Kansas City Chiefs players
American Football League All-Star players
American Football League players